Myochrous magnus is a species of leaf beetle. It is found in Central America and North America. It was first described by the American entomologist Charles Frederic August Schaeffer in 1904.

References

Further reading

 
 
 
 
 
 

Eumolpinae
Beetles described in 1904
Beetles of North America
Taxa named by Charles Frederic August Schaeffer